Taq (also Romanized as Ţāq; also known as Tak) is a village in Howmeh Rural District, in the Central District of Damghan County, Semnan Province, Iran. The town is 7km from Damghan, South of Gorgan and about 200km east of Tehran, the national capital. At the 2006 census, its population was 231, in 72 families.

The city appears to be very old appearing on the 4th century Peutinger Map. The main feature of the city is a large tell known locally as Taq Castle.

References 

Populated places in Damghan County